Ornella Bertorotta (born 25 August 1967) is an Italian politician for the Five Star Movement. She sat in the Italian Senate in the Legislature XVII of Italy after she was elected in the 2013 Italian general election.

References

External links 
 Senate biography

Living people
1967 births
21st-century Italian women politicians
Five Star Movement politicians
Politicians from Catania
Senators of Legislature XVII of Italy
Women members of the Senate of the Republic (Italy)